Volunteer is an unincorporated community in Stokes County, North Carolina, United States, approximately  east-southeast of the town of Pilot Mountain.

Unincorporated communities in Stokes County, North Carolina
Unincorporated communities in North Carolina